The Bay City Walking Dredge is a historic structure in Collier County, Florida. It was built in 1924 and declared a National Historic Mechanical Engineering Landmark in 1994. It was added to the National Register of Historic Places on May 29, 2013. It is located at 20200 E. Tamiami Trail in the vicinity of Naples, Florida at Collier-Seminole State Park. The dredge was used to construct part of the Tamiami Trail.

See also
National Register of Historic Places listings in Collier County, Florida

References

National Register of Historic Places in Collier County, Florida
Dredges
Historic Mechanical Engineering Landmarks
Buildings and structures in Naples, Florida